The  was one of the main political parties in the pre-war Empire of Japan. It was also known simply as the Seiyūkai.

Founded on September 15, 1900, by Itō Hirobumi, the Seiyūkai was a pro-government alliance of bureaucrats and former members of the Kenseitō. The Seiyūkai was the most powerful political party in the Lower House of the Diet of Japan from 1900 to 1921, and it promoted big government and large-scale public spending. Though labeled "liberal" by its own members, it was generally conservative by modern definitions. It often opposed social reforms and it supported bureaucratic control and militarism for the purpose of winning votes.  It viewed the Rikken Minseitō as its main rival.

The Seiyūkai came into power in October 1900 under the 4th Itō administration. Under its second leader, Saionji Kinmochi, it participated in the Movement to Protect Constitutional Government from 1912 to 1913. It was the ruling party under the Prime Minister Yamamoto Gonnohyōe from 1913 to 1914. Cabinet minister (and later 4th party president) Takahashi Korekiyo helped reinforce its ties with the zaibatsu, especially the Mitsui financial interests.

The 3rd party president, Hara Takashi, became Prime Minister in September 1918, and assigned every cabinet post except for the Army Minister, Navy Minister and Minister of Foreign Affairs to members of the Seiyūkai. In the 1920, the party reached the peak of its popularity.

After Hara's assassination in 1921, a large block of party members defected to form the Seiyūhontō in the 1924 General Election; however, the Seiyūkai retained enough seats to dominate the cabinet of its 5th party president, General Tanaka Giichi from 1927 to 1929.

While in the opposition during the Minseitō-dominated cabinet of Prime Minister Hamaguchi Osachi, the Seiyūkai attacked the ratification of the London Naval Treaty of 1930 as against Article 11 of the Meiji Constitution, which stipulated the independence of the military from civilian control.

After winning the 1932 General Election under Inukai Tsuyoshi, Seiyūkai formed a cabinet, floated the yen and conducted policies to revive the economy. However, after Inukai’s assassination in the May 15 Incident of 1932, factionism within the party limited its effectiveness.

In 1940 it voted to dissolve itself into the Imperial Rule Assistance Association as part of Fumimaro Konoe's efforts to create a one-party state, and thereafter ceased to exist.

Ichirō Hatoyama, who had been a Seiyūkai member of the House of Representatives, led some former party  members into the 1945 Liberal Party.

Election results

References

Works cited

Defunct conservative parties
Defunct political parties in Japan
Conservative parties in Japan
Liberal conservative parties
Political parties established in 1900
Political parties disestablished in 1940
Politics of the Empire of Japan
1900 establishments in Japan
1940 disestablishments in Japan